El alma no tiene color is a Mexican telenovela produced by Juan Osorio for Televisa in 1997. It is based on an original story by Alberto Gómez, inspired by the 1948 Mexican film Angelitos negros.

On Monday, June 23, 1997, Canal de las Estrellas started broadcasting El alma no tiene color weekdays at 5:00pm, replacing Los hijos de nadie. The last episode was broadcast on Friday, November 7, 1997 with Huracán replacing it the following day.

Laura Flores, Arturo Peniche and Celia Cruz starred as protagonists, while Lorena Rojas, Claudia Islas, Ofelia Guilmáin and Carlos Cámara starred as antagonists.

Plot
The story deals with issues related to racism by narrating the story of Guadalupe Roldán, daughter of Don Humberto Roldán and "La Negra Macaria", whom she takes as her nanny. Guadalupe, by an agreement between her family and the Álamo family to save her father from financial ruin, is forced to abandon her boyfriend, Luis Diego Morales, a teacher of modest means, and marry Lisandro del Álamo, a Rich and powerful man for whom Guadalupe has no love. But over time, Guadalupe develops strong feelings for him.

Guadalupe, when she becomes pregnant, thinks that Lisandro is the happiest man in the world. But when her child is born, she turns out to be a dark-skinned girl and Lisandro abandons Guadalupe, accusing her of adultery. Don Humberto coerces Macaria to maintain Guadalupe's true affiliation and Macaria is in no position to tell Lisandro that it is ancestry and not adultery responsible for the baby being dark-skinned.

Among this, Ana Luisa Roldán appears, Guadalupe's cousin who hates her, bringing tragedies to Guadalupe's life, takes Luis Diego from her and makes Lisandro believe that he is not the father of her daughter Estrellita. Don Humberto falls into depression and alcoholism due to the absence of his wife Sara and the disappearance of his other daughter, Sarita, whom his grandmother took very far.

Lisandro discovers that Estrellita is his daughter through Macaria, who explains that she is Guadalupe's mother. The couple reconciles but before running away from the Roldán family with Macaria.

One day, Lisandro discovers that Guadalupe works as a singer for the club "Sapo Enamorado" and sees her with bad eyes, and through an Ana Luisa trap, ends up spending the night with her. Ana Luisa pretends to be pregnant, so Lisandro agrees to marry her. Guadalupe decides to divorce him, since she does not want to leave a child without a father.

Ana Luisa poisons Lisandro's heart, making her see that if Guadalupe stays with the baby, Luis Diego will be the only father figure she will have, so that Lisandro obtains sole custody of Estrellita. However, Ana Luisa is not willing to be the mother of a black girl, so with the help of Luis Diego, her mother, Begoña Roldán, and Lisandro's ex-girlfriend, kidnap the girl and abandon her in the United States.

Before long, Sara finds the girl and decides to adopt her without knowing that she is her niece. When she informs Rodrigo, Lisandro's cousin, that she found a girl of color, she tells Lisandro about the find, and Lisandro decides to go to the United States without telling Guadalupe the truth about her daughter.

Time passes and Lisandro returns to Mexico, meets Guadalupe and asks him why he did not want to know anything about the girl, and they discover that it was all a plan by Ana Luisa and Begoña to separate them. The two reconcile and form a beautiful family, but he dies in a plane crash soon after. Guadalupe goes crazy and is admitted to a psychiatric hospital. It is there that she meets her true love, Víctor Manuel.

Ana Luisa changes her name to Sandra Bracho and assassinates the doctor who attends Guadalupe, Luis Diego and Gonzalo, her accomplice. However, seeing that the police are after her, she seeks help from Alina, Lisandro's mother. Ana Luisa tries to steal Alina's jewelry, but Alina shoots her and leaves her seriously injured. In the hospital, knowing that she will go to prison, Ana Luisa takes off her artificial respirator, causing her own death.

In the end, Estrellita asks her mother to please not abandon her, to which Guadalupe reacts and realizes that in her entire life she never decided anything for herself. For this reason, she asks Víctor Manuel for time, to be able to enjoy her daughter and her mother. A little sad, Víctor Manuel accepts.

Cast 
 
Laura Flores as Guadalupe Roldán Palacios
Arturo Peniche as Lisandro del Álamo
Celia Cruz as Macaria
Lorena Rojas as Ana Luisa Roldán/Sandra Bracho
Claudia Islas as Begoña Vda. de Roldán
Carlos Cámara as Humberto Roldán
Patricia Navidad as Sara "Sarita" Roldán Palacios
Ofelia Guilmáin as Alina Vda. de Del Álamo
Rafael Rojas as Luis Diego Morales
Aracely Arámbula as Maiguálida Roldán Palacios
Kuno Becker as Juan José
Ernesto D'Alessio as Papalote
Osvaldo Sabatini as Víctor Manuel Legarreta
Serrana as Mónica Rivero
Erika Buenfil as Diana Alcántara
Zayda Aullet as Estrella "Estrellita" del Álamo Roldán
Zulema Cruz as La Tatuada
Karla Ezquerra as Fefa
Jesús Ferca as Gonzalo
Gabriela Goldsmith as Zafiro
Renata Flores as Celadora Justina
Diana Laura as Daisy
Eduardo Luna as Rodrigo
Xavier Marc as Román
Marina Marín as Director of the women's prison
Beatriz Monroy as Doña Queca
Rigo Palma as Gonzalo
Maribel Palmer as Isadora
Ligia Robles as Mirna
Christian Rubí as Alejandra
Blanca Torres as Arcelia
Esmeralda Salinas as Ashanty
Teresa Tuccio as Martha Karina
Guillermo Zarur as Don Fulgencio
Cinthia Moreno Castro as Estrella "Estrellita" del Álamo y Roldán (baby)
Cristian Solís as Natasha
Rolando Brito
Perla Jasso

Awards

See also 
 List of telenovelas of Televisa

References

External links

1997 telenovelas
Mexican telenovelas
1997 Mexican television series debuts
1997 Mexican television series endings
Television shows set in Mexico City
Televisa telenovelas
Spanish-language telenovelas